Dean Foxcroft (born 20 April 1998) is a South African cricketer who plays domestic cricket in New Zealand.

He made his List A debut for Central Districts in the 2018–19 Ford Trophy on 4 November 2018. Prior to his List A debut, he was named in South Africa's squad for the 2016 Under-19 Cricket World Cup. He made his first-class debut for Central Districts in the 2018–19 Plunket Shield season on 6 December 2018. He made his Twenty20 debut for Central Districts in the 2018–19 Super Smash on 31 December 2018.

In June 2020, he was offered a contract by Otago ahead of the 2020–21 domestic cricket season. However, due to the COVID-19 pandemic, Foxcroft was left stranded in South Africa for the first part of the 2020–21 season. In July 2021, Foxcroft was forced again to miss out playing domestic cricket in New Zealand, after his immigration was not approved due to border restrictions in relation to the pandemic.

References

External links
 

1998 births
Living people
South African cricketers
Central Districts cricketers
Otago cricketers
Lahore Qalandars cricketers
Cricketers from Pretoria